Legionella shakespearei is a Gram-negative, weakly oxidase-positive, catalase-positive bacterium with a single polar flagellum from the genus Legionella which was isolated from a cooling tower in Stratford-upon-Avon in England. L. shakespearei is named after William Shakespeare because it was isolated in Stratford-upon-Avon.

See also
 List of organisms named after famous people (born before 1800)

References

External links
Type strain of Legionella shakespearei at BacDive -  the Bacterial Diversity Metadatabase

Legionellales
Bacteria described in 1992